Inal may refer to:

 Inal (name), both a given name and a surname
Inal, Circassian king
 İnal, Osmancık
 Inal, Mauritania, a village and rural commune in Mauritania
 Beylik of İnal, small principality in eastern Anatolia, part of Turkey
 Sayf ad-Din Inal, Mamluk sultan